For lists of female state governors, see:

 Argentina: List of female provincial governors in Argentina
 Australia: List of female state governors in Australia
 Brazil: List of female state governors in Brazil
 India: List of female governors and lieutenant governors in India
 Mexico: List of female state governors in Mexico
 Russia: List of female governors in Russia
 United States: List of female governors in the United States